The São Francisco black tyrant (Knipolegus franciscanus), also known as Caatinga black tyrant or Brazilian black tyrant, is a species of bird in the family Tyrannidae.

It is endemic to Brazil. It has often been considered a subspecies of the larger white-winged black tyrant (K. aterrimus).

Its natural habitat is subtropical or tropical dry forests.

It is threatened by habitat loss.

References

Knipolegus
Birds of the Cerrado
Endemic birds of Brazil
Birds described in 1928
Taxa named by Emilie Snethlage
Taxonomy articles created by Polbot